Moel Emoel is a hill within the Snowdonia National Park in Gwynedd, North Wales.

Location
Llyn Celyn can easily be seen between Arenig Fach and Mynydd Nodol. Bala Lake, Aran Benllyn and the distant Cadair Idris form a fine vista.

Ascent
The main route to the summit begins just outside of Bala and takes approximately 3.4 to 4 hours for a round trip. The summit is marked by stone cairn.

References

Mountains and hills of Gwynedd
Llandderfel